The Burnley Bus Company operates both local and regional bus services in Greater Manchester and Lancashire, England. It is a subsidiary of Transdev Blazefield, which operates bus services across Greater Manchester, Lancashire, North Yorkshire and West Yorkshire.

History
In August 1924, the Burnley Corporation Transport operated their first bus service between Rawtenstall and Burnley Summit. The Burnley, Colne & Nelson Joint Transport Committee was established in April 1933, merging the three municipal tramway and bus operations of the respective towns. The tramway network was progressively abandoned, with the last line closing in May 1935.

Following local government reorganisation in April 1974, the boroughs of Colne and Nelson were amalgamated to form the present-day Borough of Pendle. Subsequently, the transport operation became known as the Burnley & Pendle Joint Transport Committee.

In 1986, as part of the deregulation of bus services and to comply with the Transport Act 1985, the company's assets were transferred to a new legal entity. The operation was rebranded as the Burnley & Pendle Transport Company.

Deregulation opened Burnley & Pendle's routes to competition from other operators, with Blackburn Transport, Tyrer Tours and Victoria Coaches establishing competing services. To stave off the competition, five AEC Routemaster double-deck vehicles were purchased, with each named after a character from the television series EastEnders.

Deregulation also saw many Greater Manchester Passenger Transport Executive services contracted out. Burnley & Pendle successfully tendered a number of routes with operations extending to Blackburn, Bury, Manchester, Preston, Rawtenstall, Rochdale and Skipton.

In April 1996, Pendle Borough Council sold their share of the company to Stagecoach. Burnley Council was unhappy with the decision, and stated that they would never consider selling their share. In response, Stagecoach proposed up a multi-million pound investment plan for the area, but Burnley Council could not meet their share unless it cut other council-supported services.

In March 1997, Burnley Council reversed their decision and sold out to Stagecoach – a deal valued at £2.85 million. Initially branded Stagecoach Burnley & Pendle, the company was encompassed within Stagecoach Ribble in May 2000.

In April 2001, Stagecoach sold their operations in Blackburn, Bolton and Clitheroe to the Blazefield Group, which rebranded them as Burnley & Pendle and Lancashire United. The sale was valued at £13 million. Prior to the sale, many of the newer vehicles purchased following earlier investment by Stagecoach were transferred to other subsidiaries, being replaced by older vehicles.

Following the sale, Blazefield Group purchased a total of 15 Volvo B7TL/Plaxton President double-deck and 25 Volvo B10BLE/Wright Renown single-deck vehicles, as part of a fleet renewal program.

In January 2006, French-based operator Transdev acquired the Blazefield Group, along with 305 vehicles. Locally, the company was rebranded under the name Transdev in Burnley & Pendle.

In August 2006, Blackburn with Darwen Borough Council announced that after 125 years of municipal ownership, Blackburn Transport had been sold to Transdev Blazefield. The sale was finalised in January 2007.

In August 2007, Accrington Transport and Northern Blue were acquired, along with the transfer of staff and 65 vehicles. In September 2009, Transdev Northern Blue was integrated into the Transdev Burnley & Pendle business.

In July 2017, the company was again rebranded, now operating as The Burnley Bus Company.

Services and branding

The Burnley Bus Company 
In July 2017, a rebrand of the company commenced. Starting with the introduction of a new fleet of Optare Versa single-deck vehicles for Mainline, one of the vehicles was branded in the new two-tone orange livery. This was followed shortly after by a refurbished fleet of Volvo B10BLE/Wright Renown single-deck vehicles being repainted into the new livery. Local bus services operating in and around the town of Burnley are encompassed within The Burnley Bus Company brand, with buses serving Stoops Estate (1), Higherford (2), Pike Hill and Worsthorne (3 and 4), Harle Syke and Rose Grove (5) and Accrington (9).

Mainline 
The Mainline brand encompasses five services, which operate between Accrington (M1), Clitheroe (M2) and Burnley via Padiham, as well as between Burnley and Trawden (M3), Keighley (M4) and Barnoldswick (M5) via Nelson and Colne. In July 2017, the services were rebranded and upgraded to a fleet of Optare Versa single-deck vehicles, branded in a two-tone orange and burgundy livery. Features include free WiFi, USB and wireless charging and audio-visual next stop announcements.

Pendle Wizz 
In part, the route of the current Pendle Wizz service formerly operated under The Witch Way brand, as a through service between Skipton and Manchester via Burnley. However, owing to poor timekeeping and increasing traffic congestion in Manchester, the route was curtailed in June 2020 and now operates between Skipton and Burnley via M65, with onward connections for Manchester. The service is operated by a fleet of Volvo B7TL/Wright Eclipse Gemini double-deck vehicles, branded in a two-tone orange and purple livery. Features include free WiFi and USB charging.

Ribble Country 
In partnership with Lancashire County Council, the Ribble Country brand was introduced in May 2021 – creating 50 jobs in the local area. The brand encompasses a number of council-contracted services running in and around Burnley, Clitheroe and Pendle. Services are operated by a fleet of Mellor Strata minibuses, branded in a two-tone orange and cream livery. Features include audio-visual next stop announcements. The brand is a nod to the heritage of the routes, once operated by Ribble Motor Services, with interior branding showcasing the locally well-known Betty's Bus – named after local driver.

The Witch Way 
The Witch Way is a flagship service, which operates between Burnley and Manchester via Rawtenstall and M66. The service is operated by a fleet of high-specification Alexander Dennis Enviro 400 MMC double-deck vehicles, which were introduced into service in December 2020 and replaced the former allocation of Volvo B9TL/Wright Gemini 2 double-deck vehicles, which were introduced in October 2013. Vehicles are branded in a two-tone orange and black livery, with features including free WiFi, USB and wireless charging, tables and audio-visual next stop announcements voiced by Coronation Street actress, Jennie McAlpine.

Fleet and operations

Depots 
As of April 2022, the company operates from a single depot in Burnley (Queensgate), which it shares with Rosso.

Vehicles 
As of April 2022, the fleet consists of 81 buses. The fleet consists of diesel-powered single and double-deck buses manufactured by Alexander Dennis, Optare and Volvo, as well as minibuses manufactured by Mellor.

References

Sources

External links
 
 Burnley & Pendle Travel Limited and Transdev Blazefield on Companies House
 The Burnley Bus Company website

Bus operators in Lancashire
Transport companies established in 1933
Transdev
Transport in Burnley
Transport in the Borough of Pendle
1933 establishments in England